Juan Gilberto Funes Baldovino (8 March 1963 – 11 January 1992), nicknamed "El Búfalo" (The Buffalo), was an Argentine footballer who played as a striker, known for his physical style of play. He was born in San Luis, Argentina.

Biography
He first played football for local club Huracán de San Luis, then Estudiantes de La Plata, Sarmiento de Junin, Jorge Newbery and Gimnasia y Esgrima de Mendoza, and then for Colombian Millonarios FC in 1984. In that year, his team became runner-up of Colombian Primera A, and the following year he achieved a record 33 goals in a single season. Nowadays, he is one of the most iconic idols of the club.

Funes was a key player in the River Plate team that won the 1986 Copa Libertadores for the first time, in which he scored a goal in the first match in Cali, which River won by the score of 2–1 and at home in Buenos Aires, for the 1–0 victory against América de Cali. Ironically, this was not the first time Colombian teams and fans saw his moves; in the glory days of the Colombian league in the 1980s, Funes played for Millonarios, the team with the most championships in Colombia, where he simply "schooled" other forwards with his opportunistic technique and his attitude.

After his tenure on River Plate, Funes moved to Greece where he played for Olympiacos. With the Piraeus club Funes scored some very important goals (2 goals in the 1988 Greek Cup semifinal against OFI FC, scoring 10 goals in 29 appearances).

He returned to his homeland for a second time, being about to play for Boca Juniors but he finally could not debut with the team due to a heart failure detected by the doctors. Despite that, Funes did not end his professional career, joining Vélez Sársfield. However, his health forced him to retire shortly afterwards. He died of a heart attack on January 11, 1992. The Estadio Provincial in San Luis was named "Juan Gilberto Funes" in his honour, in 2003.

He is considered today one of the great legends of Millonarios de Bogotá, and the River Plate fans remember his goals in the 1986 Copa Libertadores Finals. Millonarios has one group of fans called Barra del Búfalo in honour of the idol of the club.

Funes was capped four times by the Argentina National Team.

Honours
River Plate
 Copa Libertadores: 1986
 Intercontinental Cup: 1986

References

External links

  

1963 births
1992 deaths
People from San Luis, Argentina
Argentine sportspeople of Spanish descent
Argentine footballers
Argentina international footballers
1987 Copa América players
Millonarios F.C. players
Club Atlético River Plate footballers
Olympiacos F.C. players
Club Atlético Vélez Sarsfield footballers
Argentine expatriate footballers
Expatriate footballers in Colombia
Expatriate footballers in Greece
Club Atlético Sarmiento footballers
Copa Libertadores-winning players
Argentine Primera División players
Categoría Primera A players
Super League Greece players
Ligue 1 players
Argentine expatriate sportspeople in Greece
Gimnasia y Esgrima de Mendoza footballers
Association football forwards